Joseph Scowcroft, known as Joe Scowcroft (8 October 1861 – 1941) was an English footballer, who played for Bolton Wanderers in the first two seasons of The Football League.

Early career
Aged 19/20 signed as a Youth Player for Great Lever. Became a senior player in 1882 and stayed with the club for six years. Left for Bolton Wanderers in 1888.

Season 1889-1890
Joe Scowcroft made his League and Club Debut on 3 November 1888. The venue was Anfield Road, the then home of Everton. Joe Scowcroft came into the Bolton Wanderers team at Left-Half. Everton won 2-1. The 'Metcalf' book has a match report on the game. Joe Scowcroft made nine appearances for Bolton Wanderers in 1888-1889, seven at Centre-Half. Playing at Centre-Half Joe Scowcroft scored his only League goal. The date was 08 December 1888, the venue was Leamington Road, the then home of Blackburn Rovers F.C.. The score was 4-4 and the match report in 'Metcalf' mentions Scowcroft' goal, which was "comical"]].

Season 1889-1890
Joe Scowcroft only appeared in Bolton Wanderers FA Cup ties in 1889-1890. He played in a Third Round tie and a Semi-Final. He played at Outside-Right in both matches. The Semi-Final was played on 8 March 1890 at Wellington Road and it was against The Wednesday F.C.. The Wednesday won 2-1. 

There are no further records about Joe Scowcroft except the year of his passing, 1951.

Statistics
Source:

References

1861 births
People from Bolton
1951 deaths
English footballers
English Football League players
Great Lever F.C. players
Bolton Wanderers F.C. players
Association football defenders